The Reformed systematic theology bibliography lists complete works of systematic theology in the Reformed tradition. Systematic theology is the orderly formulation of Christian doctrines and beliefs. This bibliography includes works which attempt to present a coherent account of all major doctrines of the Reformed faith. Theologians considered by scholars to be in the Reformed tradition are included, even if they are considered to have departed from any particular conception of the Reformed faith.

Dogmatics is sometimes used as a synonym for "systematic theology." Dogmatic theology properly covers beliefs which are normative within a church, while systematics may cover beliefs of individual theologians which are not considered to be firmly established.

Works of Reformed systematic theology

English translation available online: 
Contemporary English translation: 

English translation:  Volumes 1 & 2, 3, 4, 5

English translation: 

English translation: 

English translation: 

English translation by Robert Hill (clergyman), London, 1606

English translation: 
Contemporary English translation: 

English translation: 

English translation: 

English translation: 

English translation: 
New Translation and Critical Edition: 

English translation: 
 Volume 1, 2, 3

English translation: 

English translation: 

English translation:  Volume 1, 2

English translation: 

English translation: 

English translation: 

English translation: 

English translation: 

Calvinist theology
Christian bibliographies